Henry Henderson Institute (HHI) is an educational establishment in Blantyre, Malawi, founded in 1909. It was named in honour of Henry Henderson (1843-91), lay missionary of the Church of Scotland, who founded the Blantyre Mission.

The original foundation included a primary school, a teacher training college, a theological college, and a technical college to teach practical skills such as carpentry, bricklaying and printing. It also served as printer for the Blantyre Mission; producing religious texts, school textbooks, and government and other daily and weekly publications. Later, training in mechanical skills was added to the curriculum. In the late 1950s, a secondary school was opened.

HHI is said to have "played a most significant role in religious, educational, and political developments in Malawi".

The Institute now lies within the grounds of St Michael and All Angels Church, Blantyre.

References 

Educational institutions established in 1909
Education in Malawi
1909 establishments in the British Empire